Saurostomus is an extinct genus of prehistoric bony fish that lived during the early Toarcian stage of the Early Jurassic epoch.

See also

 Prehistoric fish

References

Early Jurassic fish
Pachycormiformes
Jurassic fish of Europe